Raymond Damblant (born 10 January 1931) is a French and Canadian judoka, one of only five Canadian judoka to achieve the rank of kudan (ninth dan), and has been deeply involved in the development of Canadian Judo, especially in Quebec. He has refereed at three Olympics and six World Judo Championships, coached the Canadian judo team on multiple occasions, held multiple positions on Judo Canada's executive committee, served as the founding President of Judo Quebec, and was inducted into the Judo Canada Hall of Fame in 1996.

Damblant was born in France and moved to Canada in 1959 to help promote judo in Quebec on behalf of the French Judo Federation. He had planned to stay for a year but instead settled in Montreal permanently. Damblant founded Club de judo Hakudokan in 1968, and retired as its technical director in 2017.

See also
Judo in Quebec
Judo in Canada
List of Canadian judoka

References

Canadian male judoka
1931 births
Living people